The RV-1 is a Stits Playboy that was constructed with modifications by Richard VanGrunsven. The aircraft was the first of a series of Van's aircraft that became the most popular homebuilt aircraft produced.

Design and development

The first RV-1 was a Stits SA-3A completed on 3 October 1965. The Playboy is a single-place, strut-braced, low-wing aircraft with conventional landing gear. The aircraft engine was upgraded from the normally-fitted  powerplant to a  Lycoming O-290G. The resulting aircraft had good performance, but a high landing speed. On 16 August 1965, the aircraft was registered as an RV-1. Modifications included a new aluminum wing with flaps, Horner wing tips, and a bubble canopy. The fuselage uses welded steel tube construction in contrast to the RV series that followed which uses all-aluminum fuselage construction. A second series of modifications included a streamlined cowling, wheel pants and modified horizontal tail surfaces.

Operational history
The organization Friends of the RV-1 was formed to restore the prototype RV-1. It was flown across the United States and Canada in 2012 to various airshows and events. On 23 July 2012, the prototype RV-1 will be showcased at the EAA AirVenture Oshkosh, prior to donation to the EAA AirVenture Museum.

The Spirit of Flight Center air museum located in Erie, Colorado has an RV-1 which is airworthy.  The Spirit of Flight RV-1 is displayed at the museum and at airshows and events.

Variants
Van's Aircraft RV-3 - The next design by VanGrunsven, based on the RV-1.

Specifications (RV-1)

References

External links

AVweb video about the RV-1
Friends of the RV-1

Homebuilt aircraft
RV-01
Low-wing aircraft
Single-engined tractor aircraft